Hoy Día (Today) is an American Spanish-language morning television show broadcast by Telemundo. The show is broadcast from Telemundo Center in Miami, and is hosted by Adamari López, Penelope Menchaca, Andrea Meza, Lisette Eduardo, and Daniel Arenas.

The series premiered on February 15, 2021, replacing Telemundo's previous morning show Un Nuevo Día. It initially had a news-based format comparable to its English equivalent Today on sister network NBC, and was produced by the network's news department Noticias Telemundo. In November 2022, Telemundo moved the program to its entertainment division; after a hiatus for the 2022 FIFA World Cup, the show was relaunched in December 2022 with an entertainment-driven format.

History

In January 2021, Telemundo announced that it would replace its existing morning show Un Nuevo Día (which had continued to face competition from Univision's dominant Despierta América) with a new program, Hoy Día, beginning February 15, 2021.

The new program would be hosted by former Noticias Univision anchor Arantxa Loizaga, Nacho Lozano (coming from Imagen Television in Mexico), and Noticias Telemundo correspondent Nicole Suárez. The first half of the program carried a focus on news headlines and discussion, with weather segments provided by meteorologist Carlos Robles (coming from KTMD in Houston, Texas), while the second half was oriented more towards lifestyle and entertainment topics, which were hosted by Adamari López and Stephanie Himonidis, who continued from Un Nuevo Día.

Loizaga stated that Hoy Día would be comparable to Today—its English-language equivalent on NBC, and explained that the program would carry a stronger focus on news content than entertainment. She cited ongoing events impacting the Latino community (such as the COVID-19 pandemic) as justification of the need to provide them "all of the resources that they require to make the right decisions for themselves and their families."

2022 revamp 
On November 18, 2022, Hoy Día went on hiatus for Telemundo Deportes coverage of the 2022 FIFA World Cup. During the hiatus, Telemundo laid off or reassigned nearly all of Hoy Día's on-air talent (aside from López). This came amid the transfer of the program from Noticias Telemundo to the network's entertainment division, which would reposition it with a "variety, news and entertainment format".

On November 30, 2022, Telemundo announced that Hoy Día would be relaunched with its new format on December 5, 2022, with López joined as host by Penelope Menchaca, Lissette "Chiky Bombom" Eduardo, Miss Universe 2020 winner Andrea Meza, and rotating guest panelists. After featuring guests hosts for over a month, it was announced on January 24, 2023, that actor Daniel Arenas would be joining the show as a permanent co-host. Arenas officially joined the program on January 25, 2023.

Hoy Día Puerto Rico

In December 2020, Telemundo's Puerto Rico station WKAQ-TV announced that it would launch a new local morning show in February 2021. On January 5, 2021, it was announced that Ivonne Orsini and Ramon "Gato" Gomez, who at the time worked with rival station WAPA, would be jumping to Telemundo to host the morning show. On January 13, 2021, it was announced that Orisini and Gomez would also be joined by former Senator and WAPA reporter Zoe Laboy as a political reporter.

On January 19, 2021, it was announced that the new program would be branded as Hoy Dia Puerto Rico — a local version of Telemundo's then-forthcoming relaunch of its morning show in the mainland, and that weekend anchor Grenda Rivera and meteorologist Elizabeth Robaina would also be joining the show to host a news segment and a weather/traffic segment respectively. It was stated that the program would have a magazine style format, and air weekdays from 8:00 a.m. to 10:00 a.m. 5 months after the show premiered, WKAQ-TV promoted Robaina to the early evening newscasts, with WKAQ chief meteorologist Roberto Cortez moving to Hoy Dìa. During its 2023 Upfront presentation, WKAQ-TV announced that Douglas Candelario will be joining Hoy Día Puerto Rico. Candelario worked for over a decade with rival station WAPA-TV where he reached popularity with his DIY/Home Gardening segments during their morning newscast. He'll bring those DIY, Home and Gardening projects to his segment Cosas de Douglas (Douglas' Things) which will air on the show every Monday, Wednesday and Friday at the 8:30am hour starting December 12, 2022.]

On January 13, 2023 it was announced on air that local radio host Jacky Fontánez would be joining Hoy Día Puerto Rico as a host. Fontánez had been guest hosting the show for a week before the announcement was made that she would be joining full time. With Fontánez's arrival the show debuted a new segment called Mi Punto de Vista (My Point of View) where Fontánez joins co-host Ivonne Orsini, news anchor Grenda Rivera and a guest in discussing hot topics.

On February 3 2023, nearly 2 years after the premiere of the show, it was announced that Ramon "Gato" Gómez would be leaving Hoy Día Puerto Rico as he prepared to join WKAQ's coverage of the 2023 BSN Basketball Tournament. Gómez, a former BSN player himself, informed the audience of his exit as WKAQ announced they now have the exclusive broadcast rights of every BSN game and that Gómez would be part of those broadcasts. Jacky Fontánez and Ivonne Orsini will continue as hosts of the show moving forward.

Notable current on-air staff
 Ivonne Orsini - Host
 Jacky Fontánez - Host
 Pamela Noa - Host
 Grenda Rivera - News Anchor
 Roberto Cortes - Chief Meteorologist 
 Desiree Lowry - Beauty Correspondent
 Suzette Baco - Lifestyle Guru
 Chef Marylin - Sazón Del Día
 Peter Hornedo - Borinqueando el Fin de Semana
 Douglas Candelario - Las Cosas de Douglas

References 

Spanish-language television shows
Telemundo original programming
2021 American television series debuts
2020s American television news shows
Television morning shows in the United States
Spanish-language television programming in the United States